Helena Meirelles (August 13, 1924 – September 28, 2005) was a Brazilian guitar player and composer.
Born in Mato Grosso do Sul she was one of the most important composers of the folk musical style of this region. Considered to be the Brazilian version of Robert Johnson, she was elected, in 1994 by Guitar Player magazine as one of the top 100 guitar players in the world.

See also
List of Brazilians

References

1924 births
2005 deaths
Brazilian composers
Brazilian people of indigenous peoples descent
20th-century guitarists